NGO Affairs Bureau is a government bureau in Bangladesh that regulates Non-governmental agencies.

History 
NGO Affairs Bureau was founded in 1990. All NGOs that receive fund from outside Bangladesh are required by law to register with the bureau which falls under the Prime Minister's office.  Mohammad Asadul Islam is the present director general of the bureau. There are 2,498 NGOs registered with the bureau of which 240 are foreign and the rest are domestic.

References

Government agencies of Bangladesh
Organisations based in Dhaka
Government agencies established in 1990
1990 establishments in Bangladesh
Regulation of non-governmental organizations